Central Stadium of Jonava is a multi-purpose stadium in Jonava, Lithuania. It is currently the biggest stadium in the city.

The seating capacity is going to be expanded to 3,000. Near stadium is outdoor pond, which can be used for water events.

Events 
The stadium hosts football matches, regional athletics events, strength sports, etc. It also can host outdoor basketball and volleyball championships. The stadium also has hosted some cultural events.

Equipment 
2 grass fields (mostly using for football)
Running tracks
6 street basketball squads
Rugby and volleyball equipment
Beach volleyball squad
Screen and lighting

References

External links

Official website

Jonava Central Stadium
Sports venues in Jonava
Jonava Central Stadium
Jonava Central Stadium
Buildings and structures in Jonava